"Barbara Ann" is a song written by Fred Fassert that was first recorded by the Regents as "Barbara-Ann". Their version was released in 1961 and reached number 13 on the Billboard Hot 100 chart. The more famous version was recorded by the Beach Boys for their 1965 in-house live album Beach Boys' Party!. In December, "Barbara Ann" was issued as a single with the B-side "Girl Don't Tell Me", peaking at number 2 in the U.S. and number 3 in the UK. The Regents' original version was featured in the 1973 film American Graffiti and later included on the soundtrack album.

The Beach Boys version

The Beach Boys recorded their version on September 23, 1965. Dean Torrence of Jan and Dean is featured on lead vocals along with Brian Wilson. Torrence is not credited on the album, but Carl Wilson is heard saying "Thanks, Dean" at the song's conclusion. Capitol's Al Coury rush-released "Barbara Ann" as a single without informing the band, after the relatively poor performance of the group's previous disc, "The Little Girl I Once Knew".

The song entered the Billboard Hot 100 chart the week ending January 1, 1966. However, "My Love" by Petula Clark unexpectedly vaulted into the  position the week ending February 5, 1966. It also topped the charts in Germany, Switzerland and Norway. It was The Beach Boys' biggest hit in Italy, reaching .

Cash Box said the Beach Boys apply a "distinctive, easy-going style complete with plenty harmony and counterpoint portions."

Variations of the Beach Boys' recording have seen release. A version without the party sound effects can be found on the Hawthorne, CA album. The group sang the song as an encore on their Live in London album. As a solo artist, Brian has a rendition on his live album Live at the Roxy Theatre, and in 2001, performed it himself, with the ensemble, on An All-Star Tribute to Brian Wilson.

In 1987, the group re-recorded the song as "Here Come the Cubs" with re-written lyrics about the Chicago Cubs. It became the team's official theme that year, replacing "Go, Cubs, Go".

The Who perform "Barbara Ann" in the film The Kids Are Alright with Keith Moon on vocals.  Moon, a massive Beach Boys fan but a notoriously limited singer, plays and sings much to the delight of his fellow band members. An earlier version by them was released on the Ready Steady Who EP in 1966.

Other versions

 1962 – Jan and Dean
 1966 – The Who, Ready Steady Who
 1975 – Martin Circus (as "Marylène", with French lyrics)
 1989 – Blind Guardian, Follow the Blind
 2002 – ApologetiX, Grace Period (as "Baa! We're Lambs")
 2010 – "Banana Song", Despicable Me (sung by the Minions)
 2013 – Elements of Life

"Bomb Iran"

The song was parodied as "Bomb Iran" by various musicians, including Vince Vance and the Valiants, during the 1979 Iran hostage crisis.

On April 17, 2007, at an appearance in Murrells Inlet, South Carolina during the 2008 presidential election campaign, U.S. Senator John McCain responded to a question from an audience member about military action against Iran by referring to "That old, eh, that old Beach Boys song, 'Bomb Iran'," and then singing the parody chorus, "Bomb, bomb, bomb, bomb, anyway, ah ..."

Charts

Weekly charts

Year-end charts

References

The Beach Boys songs
Jan and Dean songs
1961 songs
1965 singles
1966 singles
Cashbox number-one singles
Number-one singles in Norway
The Who songs
Song recordings produced by Brian Wilson
Capitol Records singles
Gee Records singles
Doo-wop songs
1961 singles